Dachi is a town in Xinluo District, Longyan, Fujian, China, located about  from downtown Longyan along China National Highway 319. , it has 13 villages under its administration.

See also
 List of township-level divisions of Fujian

References

Township-level divisions of Fujian
Longyan